The Beatles: Rock Band is a 2009 music video game developed by Harmonix, published by MTV Games and distributed by Electronic Arts, in association with Apple Corps. It is the third major console release in the Rock Band music video game series and is available on the PlayStation 3, Xbox 360, and Wii consoles. The game allows one to six players to simulate the performance of songs by the Beatles by providing the players with peripherals modelled after musical instruments (a guitar peripheral for lead guitar and bass gameplay, a drum peripheral, and a microphone). The gameplay mechanics of the game are similar to those found in other Rock Band games, in which players use the instrument controllers to match scrolling on-screen notes in time to the music to score points.

The 45-song selection of the Beatles' music on the game's disc was praised by critics, considering the list to be emotional, sentimental and a good cross-section of the band's catalogue. Compared to other music video games released previously, the number of tracks in The Beatles: Rock Band was considered small, and the inclusion of certain lesser-known songs, and the exclusion of more popular ones, was considered confusing. In addition to the on-disc songs, The Beatles: Rock Band featured downloadable content, in the form of both singles and full albums (excluding those songs already on disc), allowing players to play through the album in a single session, once the album has been obtained.

On-disc track listing
The game disc features 45 songs chosen from the 12 original UK albums by the Beatles, the US album Magical Mystery Tour, the 2006 remix album Love and several non-album singles. Though "Sgt. Pepper's Lonely Hearts Club Band" and "With a Little Help From My Friends" are considered to be two songs, they can only be played back-to-back within the game. All songs except "The End" are playable immediately in Quickplay and other multiplayer modes, while in Career mode, players complete through the songs in a loosely historical order; upon completion of the Career mode, "The End", the mode's final song, becomes available for all other game modes. Regardless of game mode, each song is played in a specific venue. Most venues are based on a historical progression of famous Beatles' performances, including their first appearance on American television on The Ed Sullivan Show and their concert at Shea Stadium. For the Abbey Road venue, each song (except "Hey Bulldog") has a unique "Dreamscape"; the songs start with the Beatles in the studio, then dissolve into the imaginative Dreamscape inspired by the song, finally arriving back at the studio at the end of the song.

All songs by Lennon–McCartney except "Here Comes the Sun," "I Me Mine," "If I Needed Someone," "Something," "Taxman," "While My Guitar Gently Weeps" and "Within You Without You" by George Harrison; "Octopus's Garden" by Richard Starkey; "Boys" by Luther Dixon and Wes Farrell; and "Twist and Shout" by Phil Medley and Bert Berns.

The 45 songs included on the game disc are as follows, with the year the song was originally released, the album the song was published on and the game venue at which the song is performed:

Downloadable songs track listing
In addition to on-disc songs, players can purchase additional downloadable content for The Beatles: Rock Band from their console's respective online stores. Unlike other console games in the Rock Band series, downloadable content for The Beatles: Rock Band is not playable in the other games, nor will The Beatles: Rock Band use content from the other games. Part of this is due to new Dreamscapes that have been created for the downloadable songs. In the end, one song ("All You Need Is Love") and the remaining songs from three albums that were not already on-disc were released as downloadable content; content made available depended on the sales performance of the already available downloadable tracks, as Harmonix stated the costs to produce these tracks—including travel to Abbey Road studios and their engineers' time—were more expensive than their regular Rock Band downloadable songs.

All individual songs (including the two- or three-song segments from the Abbey Road medley) were priced at $1.99 (160 Microsoft Points/200 Wii Points) and were available for download through the PlayStation Network, Xbox Live and the in-game Music Store on the Wii. The first album to be released as downloadable content, Abbey Road, was priced at $16.98 (1360 Microsoft Points) as a whole. Unique to Abbey Road, those that purchased the full album are able to play the entire medley as a single song in addition to the smaller segments offered.

The download of "All You Need Is Love" was originally exclusive to Xbox 360 at launch, with the proceeds of over $200,000 donated to the charity Doctors Without Borders/Médecins Sans Frontières.  It was later released for Wii on February 16, 2010 and for PlayStation 3 on March 4, 2010.

All downloadable content for The Beatles: Rock Band was removed from sale on the respective storefronts on May 5, 2016, as the licensing contracts with the rights holder have expired, though players that have already purchased this content will still be able to download the songs.

All songs by Lennon–McCartney except "Think for Yourself" and "Within You Without You" by George Harrison, and "What Goes On" by Lennon–McCartney–Starkey.

The following songs are played at Abbey Road Studios except the songs in bold from Rubber Soul which are played at Shea Stadium.

References

External links
Official website

Rock Band
Lists of video game downloadable content
Rock Band soundtracks